The Granite City Lumberjacks are a Tier III Junior A ice hockey team playing in the North American 3 Hockey League (NA3HL) and plays their home games at the Armadillo Deck Sports Arena, located in Sauk Rapids, Minnesota. The Lumberjacks play 48 regular season games, in addition to showcase and post-season tournament games.

History
The team was founded in 2007 as a member of the Minnesota Junior Hockey League (MnJHL).

The Granite City Lumberjacks were the 2008–09 MnJHL regular season champions and qualified for the USA Hockey Tier III Jr. A National Championship Tournament, joining the 2009 playoff champions, the Minnesota Ice Hawks. The team won the MnJHL championship in the 2010–11 season with a 2-1 overtime win over the Rochester Ice Hawks.

In 2011, the Lumberjacks and MnJHL rival, the Minnesota Flying Aces, announced a move from the MnJHL to the NA3HL as part of the league's expansion to 16 teams for the 2011–12 season. The two teams joined two expansion teams, the Twin City Steel and North Iowa Bulls, to form the NA3HL West Division.

In the 2011–12 Season, the Lumberjacks claimed the West Division Title, West Division Playoff Title and the 2012 NA3HL Silver Cup Championship. However, they did not participate in the 2012 USA Hockey Tier III National Tournament.

The Lumberjacks would also win the 2015 Silver Cup Championship over the North Iowa Bulls. The Lumberjacks only qualified for the Silver Cup Tournament as wildcard after losing in the Divisional Finals to the Bulls. In 2017, the Lumberjacks won their third Silver Cup Championship with a 2–1 game against the Metro Jets.

Season-by-season records

USA Hockey Tier III Junior Hockey National Championship

Alumni
The Lumberjacks have produced a number of alumni playing in higher levels of junior hockey, NCAA Division I, Division III, and ACHA college programs.

References

External links
Lumberjacks Webpage 

Ice hockey teams in Minnesota
2007 establishments in Minnesota
Ice hockey clubs established in 2007
Sports in St. Cloud, Minnesota